Wildt is a small lunar impact crater that is located near the eastern limb of the Moon. It was named after German-American astronomer Rupert Wildt. It was previously designated Condorcet K. The nearest named crater is Condorcet to the west-northwest. The crater is circular and bowl-shaped, with a small floor at the midpoint of the sloping interior walls. It has not received significant wear from subsequent impacts.

See also 
 1953 Rupertwildt, main-belt asteroid

References

External links

 LTO-63A3 Wildt — L&PI topographic map

Impact craters on the Moon